TVIS may refer to:

 T-VIS, which stands for Toyota Variable Induction System, is a variable intake system designed by Toyota.
 Treadmill with Vibration Isolation System is a treadmill which has been designed for use on the International Space Station.